The men's singles four wood is one of the events at the annual Bowls England National Championships.

The four-wood singles is the traditional variation of the game; see Glossary of bowls terms.

The 1908 final was started at the Upper Clapton greens but was suspended with Knight leading 14–7 following the death of the skip during the fours event. The final resumed at the Streatham Constitutional Club the following day.

Past winners

References

Bowls in England